The chikara  is a bowed stringed musical instrument from India, used to play indian folk music. It is used by the tribal people of Rajasthan, Madhya Pradesh and Uttar Pradesh.

Description
The chikara is a simple spike fiddle played, similarly to the sarangi or sarinda, by sliding fingernails on the strings rather than pressing them to touch the fingerboard. 
It has 3 strings, two horse hair and one steel, in 3 courses and is tuned C, F, G.

Ambiguity
The term "chikara" is often used ambiguously to describe a variety of unrelated folk fiddles of northern india.

Related Instruments
Chikari, smaller version of chikara.
Sarangi

References

String instruments
Indian musical instruments
Bengali music